Sandarmokh is a forest massif  from Medvezhyegorsk in the Republic of Karelia where possibly thousands of victims of Stalin's Great Terror were executed. More than 58 nationalities were shot and buried there by the NKVD in 236 communal pits over a 14-month period in 1937 and 1938.

A thousand of the victims were from the Solovki special prison in the White Sea. It was long thought that the barges carrying them were deliberately sunk on the way to the mainland, drowning all the prisoners on board. Others were rounded up during the Great Terror in Karelia, in accordance with quotas for prisoners, 'enemies of the regime', and a variety of "national operations". According to available documentation at least 6,000 were shot and buried at Sandarmokh.

Today Sandarmokh is a memorial to the crimes of Stalin and his regime and since 1998 has been the focus of an international Day of Remembrance on 5 August every year.

Discovery and remembrance
On 27 October 1937, 1,116 prisoners were loaded onto three barges and taken from Solovki to the mainland.

Only in 1996, thanks to the efforts of Veniamin Ioffe (1938–2002), co-chairman of the Memorial research centre in St Petersburg, documents were found in the archives of the Arkhangelsk department of the Federal Security Service (FSB) throwing light on the subsequent fate of the "first Solovki transport". These included the lists of those men and women who were to be shot. (One died before he could be executed; four more were sent to other parts of the Gulag.)

After years of work on the ground in Karelia by Yuri Dmitriev, this documentary evidence pointed the way to the identification on 1 July 1997 of the Solovki prisoners' last resting place and that of another 5,000 executed individuals. The location would subsequently be given the local (Karelian) name "Sandarmokh" (sometimes spelled "Sandormokh"). The story of that search and discovery was told in 2017 by Irina Flige, head of the Memorial Education and Information Centre in St Petersburg. In 2015 Dmitriev recounted how he, Flige and the late Veniamin Ioffe had found the burial site. According to documents found in the FSB archives in Arkhangelsk, there were people of 58 nationalities among those shot at Sandarmokh.

Three hundred personal plaques and memorials have been erected around the site since 1997 to commemorate the many victims of this killing field, both individually and as representatives of particular nations and cultures, and an international Day of Remembrance has been held there every 5 August since 1998. In 2010, Patriarch Kirill of the Russian Orthodox Church led the mass for the slain victims of Stalin at Sandarmokh, just as he and his predecessor Alexy II have done, every year since 2007, at the Butovo killing field near Moscow.

Today, thanks to the Memorial Society, to Veniamin Ioffe and Yury Dmitriev, over 5,000 of the dead of Sandarmokh can again be named and remembered individually, at the place where they lie buried.

Ukraine declared 2012 as "Sandarmokh List Year" in reference to several hundred Ukrainian language writers and poets from the Executed Renaissance who were arrested, shot, and buried at Sandarmokh after the Great Turn, when new Soviet General Secretary Joseph Stalin decided, as a preliminary to the Holodomor, to reverse the Post-1917 policies of Korenizatsiya and Ukrainianization. These otherwise Pro-Soviet writers refused to submit to Stalin's return to the House of Romanov's policy of the coercive Russification of Ukraine and were shot, according to the Ukrainian Government, because they inspired the people of Ukraine with their own national culture, filling them "with pride and strength".

Those shot at Sandarmokh, 1937–1938

The thousands executed over 14 months from October 1937 to December 1938 fall into three broad groups. Many were from Karelia, a total of 2,344 free inhabitants of the republic. A smaller number (624) were forced "settlers" (i.e. peasants exiled to the North after the collectivisation of agriculture). A great many of those shot (1,988) were already prisoners of the Belbaltlag (White Sea-Baltic Canal) camp system. A smaller group of 1,111 prisoners were brought there from Solovki prison camp. Together they made up almost half of those shot during the Great Terror in Karelia.

"Alongside hard-working peasants, fishermen and hunters from nearby villages," wrote Yury Dmitriev wrote: "there were writers and poets, scientists and scholars, military leaders, doctors, teachers, engineers, clergy of all confessions and statesmen who found their final resting place here." Among the last named group were prominent members of the intelligentsia from the many national and ethnic cultures of the USSRfor example, Finns, Karelians, and Volga Germans. Ukraine was especially singled out, losing 289 of its writers, dramatists and other public figures, the "Executed Renaissance", in a single day.

The following 25 individuals illustrate this variety. They are listed by surname in alphabetical order:

 Prince , Imperial Russian Army officer, actor and theatre director: shot 27 October 1937, aged 44
 Fyodor Bagrov, head of collective farm, Karelia: shot 22 April 1938, aged 42
 Shio Batmanishvili, a Georgian Hieromonk, the Superior of the Servites of the Immaculate Conception, and both the Apostolic Administrator and Exarch of the Georgian Greek Catholic Church, shot 1 November 1937,
 Nikolai Durnovo, Russian linguist, shot 27 October 1937, aged 60
 Hryhorii Epik, Ukrainian writer: shot 3 November 1937, aged 36
 Vasily Helmersen, Russian librarian and artist: shot 9 December 1937, aged 64
 , a Karelian writer: shot 8 January 1938, aged 39
 Myroslav Irchan, Ukrainian writer, journalist, and playwright: shot 3 November 1937, aged 40
 Alexei Kostin, member of collective farm, Karelia: shot 9 March 1938, aged 39
 , organiser of an underground Catholic group in Moscow: shot 27 October 1937, aged 45
 Mykola Kulish, Ukrainian writer, educator, journalist, and playwright: shot 3 November 1937, aged 40
 Les Kurbas, Ukrainian theater director: shot 3 November 1937, aged 50
 Kuzebay Gerd, Udmurt writer and public figure: shot 1 November 1937, aged 39
 , literary critic: shot 4 November 1937, aged 32
 Valerian Pidmohylny, a Ukrainian writer: shot 3 November 1937, aged 37
 Mykhailo Poloz, a Ukrainian politician, diplomat, statesman, and participant of the Treaty of Brest-Litovsk: shot 3 November 1937, aged 45
 Nikita Remnev, carpenter, Karelia: shot 3 April 1938, aged 37
 , Ukrainian military leader: shot 3 November 1937, aged 50
 , Soviet diplomat, ex-Bolshevik: shot 4 November 1937, aged 62
 Kalle Toppinen, Finn, carpenter, Karelia: shot 5 March 1938, aged 45
 , Finnish journalist: shot 28 December 1937, aged 41
 Archbishop  of Kursk and Oboyan, Russian Orthodox Church: shot 3 November 1937, aged 64
 Father , Volga German Roman Catholic priest: shot 3 November 1937, aged 45
 Anton Yablotsky, Polish "special settler" from Ukraine: shot 21 January 1938, aged 37
 Mykhailo Yalovy, Ukrainian writer, publicist, playwright: shot 3 November 1937, aged 42
 Mykola Zerov, Ukrainian poet: shot 3 November 1937, aged 47

Members of the Finnish diaspora who emigrated to the USSR during the Great Depression and who were later arrested and shot at Sandarmokh as a part of the Finnish Operation of the NKVD, are listed by John Earl Haynes and Harvey Klehr in their study In Denial: Historians, Communism, and Espionage (2003). They included 141 Finnish Americans, and 127 Finnish Canadians.

Victims and executioners

It is often said or assumed of Soviet mass executions that they were carried out by firing squad. For the Soviet regime and, later, the Third Reich, this method of execution was the exception, not the rule.

From early days onwards, the preferred Soviet method of quick despatch was to dig a trench and then, the executioner standing immediately behind the upright or kneeling victim, shoot the victims at point blank range in the back of the head. This was the infamous "nine grammes of lead". The victims tumbled into the trench and were buried; sometimes another, control shot (контрольный выстрел, kontrolnyi vystrel) was fired into the victim's head to make sure he or she was dead, sometimes only one shot was used. (A rare, extended description by a former executioner of how such mass killings were organised can be found in Lev Razgon's 1988 memoirs.)

This was the method used at Sandarmokh, Krasny Bor and Svirlag in the late 1930s, as the skulls found at these sites amply testify. Cross-examined while under arrest in 1939, the chief executioner Mikhail Matveyev said he made the victims lie face down in the prepared trench and then shot them.

Thanks to the efforts of Ivan Chukhin, founder of Memorial in Karelia, a national deputy to the Supreme Soviet (and the Duma) and Yury Dmitriev's mentor, the names of the members of the troika which rubber-stamped decisions to shoot a list of individualsthe accused were not present at these sessions, no one defended their rightsand of the execution squad leaders became known by the mid-1990s.

The man sent from Leningrad on 16 October 1937 to organise the shooting of the Solovki transport, Matveyev, was an experienced NKVD executioner. He was succeeded at Sandarmokh by I.A. Bondarenko and his deputy A.F. Shondysh. Matveyev survived into old age; his successors were both arrested in 1938 and shot in 1939 for "exceeding their authorisation".

New digs and alternative hypothesis
Starting in 2016, there were attempts to revise this account of the shootings at Sandarmokh, and claim that among the dead were Soviet POWs shot by the invading Finns in 1941–1944. There were newspaper articles and TV broadcasts in Russia; there was also a publication in the Finnish press. In the same year, a sexual abuse investigation against Yuri Dmitriyev was launched by authorities.

The motivation behind this claim and the supposed new evidence were both challenged. In a lengthy and detailed investigation, Russian journalist Anna Yarovaya examined the evidence and interviewed historians and those who had found the site. She talked to Finnish historians of the Second World War; Irina Flige of the Memorial Society and Sergei Kashtanov, head of the district administration where the killing fields were found. She also interviewed Sergei Verigin, one of the Russian historians putting forward the new hypothesis. Russian newspapers and television had talked of "thousands" of POWs being shot by the Finns and buried at Sandarmokh: speaking on the record to Yarovaya, Verigin was more cautious and spoke of dozens and hundreds.

The Karelian edition of the State-run Rossiya TV channel announced briefly on 22 April 2018 that there would be new investigations at Sandarmokh "this summer".

Agence France-Presse covered later developments in September 2018, citing critics who state that the digs have a political motivation to manipulate public opinion and an attempt to cover up Stalinist crimes. The European External Action Service's EUvsDisinfo.eu website has classified the claims that Finns are responsible for the Sandarmokh killings as "pro-Kremlin disinformation".

The head of the local museum, Serge Koltyrin, was arrested in October 2018, shortly after he publicly criticized the new excavations. He was convicted in a closed trial of pedophilia for 9 years in prison. In early March 2020, a local court decided to release him due to a terminal illness, however, the prosecutor challenged this decision and Koltyrin died in a prison hospital on 2 April 2020.

Publications
 Yury A. Dmitriev (1999), Sandarmokh, the Place of Execution (in Russian), 350 pp. Bars Publishers: Petrozavodsk.
Petrozavodsk. (Also available online «Поминальные списки Карелии, 1937–1938: Уничтоженная Карелия, часть 2. Большой террор».) The Lists contain over 14,000 names.

See also
 Kommunarka shooting ground
 Mass graves in the Soviet Union
 Memorial (society)
 Category:People shot and buried in Sandarmokh (Russian Wikipedia)

References

External links
 
 Пам’яті жертв соловецького розстрілу, «Львівська газета», 4 April 2007, retrieved 7 August 2017 
 Their Names Restored: Russia's Books of Remembrance website, Search: "Sandarmokh", "Kniga pamyati Karelii", 4,974 names. Retrieved 7 August 2017 
 "Those killed at Sandormokh in 1937–8, a list of 5,126 names compiled by the historian Yury A. Dmitriev", Sandormokh, Ioffe Foundation website. Retrieved 13 August 2017 
 Nikita Petrov, "The butchers of Sandarmokh", Novaya gazeta, No. 84, 4 August 2017, pp. 8–9 .
 Also see Krasny Bor, 1937–1938, with acknowledgements to the Karelian Republic's Ministry of Culture 
 Russia's Necropolis of Terror and the Gulag: a select directory of burial grounds and commemorative sites
 

Soviet Union
Great Purge
Massacres in the Soviet Union
Political repression in the Soviet Union
NKVD
Politicides
Monuments and memorials in Russia
Cultural heritage monuments of regional significance in the Republic of Karelia